Aris Thessaloniki Baseball Club is a baseball club based in Thessaloniki, Greece; it is owned by one of the biggest sports clubs in Greece, Aris Thessaloniki. The club was established in 2002 and is the only major baseball club in Macedonia and one of the most important in Greece.

From its first participation in the Hellenic Baseball League, Aris managed to finish in the first three places, being able to play in three international league cups.

Also Aris Baseball Club hosts the biggest baseball tournament in Greece every year in September–October, the Aris Baseball Cup.

In 2008, the club started a women's softball team, which participates at the Greek Softball Championship.

Players

Srdjan Milosavljevic
Angelo Vadasis
Apostolos Papaeuthimiou
Tzortzis Markou
Christos Testempasis
Vasilis Dalakouras
Dimitris Gazis
Kostas Chatzimilioudis 
Jake Chamonikolas
Andreas Kargakos
Nikos Tsipouridis
Spyros Krithis 
Laszlo Horvath
Alex Tichenor
Ellis Iliesku 
Thanos Stefos 
Thodoris Alexakis
Stefanidis Vasilis 
Kadoglou Stratos 
Tsompanoglou Nikos 
Benevas Tolis 
Migniola Marco 
Gennaios Kostas 
Gennaios Christos
Lampros Patouchas
Giorgos Chatzimilioudis
Modestos Kaskatis
Krithis Nikos
Reynaldo Cruanas Muzio
Sam Pineda
Makis Moustakas
Milan Fatsis
Omar Cuesta

See also
Aris Thessaloniki
Baseball in Greece

External links
Official Baseball website

Aris Thessaloniki
Baseball teams in Greece
Baseball teams established in 2002
2002 establishments in Greece